Bidyut Kumar Roy is a Bangladeshi former weightlifter. He has won 26 consecutive gold medals in different categories since his maiden appearance in the 1988 national meet. He is the recipient of 2005 Bangladesh National Sports Award in the weightlifting category. He served as the weightlifting coach for Bangladesh in the 2018 Commonwealth Games.

Career
During his 27-year playing career, Roy won bronze medals in the 7th, 8th, 9th South Asian Games and won silver medals in the 2012 Commonwealth Weightlifting Championship and the 2012 South Asian Weightlifting Championship.

References 

Living people
1970s births
Bangladeshi male weightlifters
Recipients of the Bangladesh National Sports Award
Date of birth missing (living people)
Place of birth missing (living people)
Weightlifters at the 1998 Asian Games
Weightlifters at the 2010 Asian Games
South Asian Games bronze medalists for Bangladesh
Asian Games competitors for Bangladesh
South Asian Games medalists in weightlifting